Flying J may refer to:
FJ Management, the original Flying J Inc.
Pilot Flying J, a truck stop chain that partially constitutes the former truck stop division of the original Flying J Inc.